Bon Appétit is a restaurant located at 9 James Terrace, Malahide, County Dublin, Ireland. It is a fine dining restaurant that received one Michelin star in each year from 2008 until 2015.

The restaurant is established in 2006 and housed in a classic Georgian house in the village of Malahide. Aside from the Michelin-starred restaurant there is also a brasserie in the building. Prior to 'Bon Appétit' it housed "Johnny's" (1974–1989), a restaurant run by Johnny Opperman, and "Bon Appetit" (1990–2006), run by Patsy McGuirck.

The head chef of Bon Appétit is Oliver Dunne.

See also
List of Michelin starred restaurants in Ireland

Sources and references

External links
 
 Ireland Guide

Restaurants in the Republic of Ireland
Michelin Guide starred restaurants in Ireland
Buildings and structures in Fingal